Eamonn O'Kane (born 18 March 1982) is an Irish former professional boxer who held the IBF Intercontinental middleweight title.

Amateur career
As captain of the Northern Irish team, O'Kane won the gold medal at the 2010 Commonwealth Games in the middleweight division.

Commonwealth Games results
2010
Defeated Ranil Jayathilakage (Sri Lanka) 5–0
Defeated Nathon McKwen (New Zealand) 9–2
Defeated Afaese Fata (Samoa) 7–2
Defeated Keiran Harding (Wales) 12–6
Defeated Anthony Ogogo (England) 16–4

Professional career
In May 2012, O'Kane won the Prizefighter 24: All-Irish Middleweights tournament, defeating Anthony Fitzgerald via split decision in the quarter-finals, Ryan Greene via first-round technical knockout in the semi-finals and JJ McDonagh via unanimous decision in the final.

Professional boxing record 

|-
|align="center" colspan=8|17 fights, 14 wins (5 knockouts), 2 losses, 1 draw
|-
| align="center" style="border-style: none none solid solid; background: #e3e3e3"|Res.
| align="center" style="border-style: none none solid solid; background: #e3e3e3"|Record
| align="center" style="border-style: none none solid solid; background: #e3e3e3"|Opponent
| align="center" style="border-style: none none solid solid; background: #e3e3e3"|Type
| align="center" style="border-style: none none solid solid; background: #e3e3e3"|Rd., Time
| align="center" style="border-style: none none solid solid; background: #e3e3e3"|Date
| align="center" style="border-style: none none solid solid; background: #e3e3e3"|Location
| align="center" style="border-style: none none solid solid; background: #e3e3e3"|Notes
|- align=center
|Loss
|14–2–1
|align=left| Tureano Johnson
|
|
|
|align=left|
|align=left|
|- align=center
|Win
|align=center|14–1–1||align=left| Lewis Taylor
|
|
|
|align=left|
|align=left|
|- align=center
|Win
|align=center|13–1–1||align=left| Ferenc Hafner
|
|
|
|align=left|
|align=left|
|- align=center
|style="background: #B0C4DE"|Draw
|align=center|12–1–1||align=left| Virgilijus Stapulionis
|
|
|
|align=left|
|align=left|
|- align=center
|Win
|align=center|12–1||align=left| Álvaro Gaona
|
|
|
|align=left|
|align=left|
|- align=center
|Win
|align=center|11–1||align=left| Kerry Hope
|
|
|
|align=left|
|align=left|
|- align=center
|Win
|align=center|10–1||align=left| Anthony Fitzgerald
|
|
|
|align=left|
|align=left|
|- align=center
|Win
|align=center|9–1||align=left| Gary Boulden
|
|
|
|align=left|
|align=left|
|- align=center
|Loss
|align=center|8–1||align=left| John Ryder
|
|
|
|align=left|
|align=left|
|- align=center
|Win
|align=center|8–0||align=left| Terry Carruthers
|
|
|
|align=left|
|align=left|
|- align=center
|Win
|align=center|7–0||align=left| JJ McDonagh
|
|
|
|align=left|
|align=left|
|- align=center
|Win
|align=center|6–0||align=left| Ryan Greene
|
|
|
|align=left|
|align=left|
|- align=center
|Win
|align=center|5–0||align=left| Anthony Fitzgerald
|
|
|
|align=left|
|align=left|
|- align=center
|Win
|align=center|4–0||align=left| Wayne Reed
|
|
|
|align=left|
|align=left|
|- align=center
|Win
|align=center|3–0||align=left| Joe Rea
|
|
|
|align=left|
|align=left|
|- align=center
|Win
|align=center|2–0||align=left| Tommy Tolan
|
|
|
|align=left|
|align=left|
|- align=center
|Win
|align=center|1–0|| align=left| Dmitrij Kalinovskij
|
|
|
|align=left|
|align=left|

References

1982 births
Living people
Male boxers from Northern Ireland
Boxers at the 2010 Commonwealth Games
Middleweight boxers
Commonwealth Games gold medallists for Northern Ireland
Commonwealth Games medallists in boxing
Medallists at the 2010 Commonwealth Games